"Livin' in the Sunlight, Lovin' in the Moonlight" is a popular song that was written by Al Sherman and Al Lewis for the 1930 film The Big Pond starring Maurice Chevalier, who made it famous.  On March 22, 1930, Bing Crosby and the Paul Whiteman Orchestra recorded a popular cover of this song as well. This registered in the charts of the day at the No. 16 position.

Bernie Cummins and his Orchestra also enjoyed success with the song in 1930 achieving a No. 20 spot. Al Bowlly recorded the song with Les Allen on October 17, 1930 (see Al Bowlly Discography). Another British cover version was by the sibling duo Bob and Alf Pearson.

In 1968, Tiny Tim sang a cover of this song. This unusual ukulele version of the song was used and re-popularized in the SpongeBob SquarePants pilot episode, "Help Wanted". In January 2008, American Idol contestant Sarah Whitaker auditioned with the song. Valve originally considered using Tiny Tim's version of the song in the Meet the Pyro trailer for the class based multiplayer game Team Fortress 2, though ultimately went with "Do You Believe in Magic" by The Lovin' Spoonful. Tiny Tim's version of the song was used in ABC television network show Speechless in season 3 episode 17.

References

 Sherman, Robert B. Walt's Time: from before to beyond, Santa Clarita: Camphor Tree Publishers, 1998.

Songs written by Al Sherman
Songs written by Al Lewis (lyricist)
Bing Crosby songs
Songs written for films
1930 songs
Al Bowlly songs